biographical drama film produced by Phantom Films, Nadiadwala Grandson Entertainment, Reliance Entertainment and HRX Films at budget of ₹60 crore. Based on the life of mathematics teacher and educator Anand Kumar as well as educational program of the same title, it is directed by Vikas Bahl and stars Hrithik Roshan as Kumar.

The film marked the last production of Phantom Films. It was released in cinemas on 12 July 2019. Roshan's performance received widespread acclaim. With a worldwide gross of ₹208 crore, the film emerged as a major commercial success and one of the top-grossing Hindi films of 2019.

Plot

The movie begins with Fugga, a successful person, giving a talk in London. Fugga recalls his experience of learning from his teacher, Anand Kumar.

The scenes go back in time to show a younger Anand in college. Anand is a lower-class student who has a passion for studies and is good at it. At a local competition felicitation, the local minister, Shriram Singh, proud of him, promises to help whenever needed.

Anand frequently goes to Banaras Hindu University's library to learn mathematics by solving problems in a foreign Math journal. One day, the library supervisor finally catches him and says that he has no right to read there. One staff member suggests he get his article published in this journal and earn a free lifetime subscription to it. Anand goes to the post office, where his father Rajendra works as the head, and posts a letter regarding the solution to a difficult Math problem that no one has been able to solve yet. He then gets featured in the journal for solving the problem and gets a letter from Professor Richard of the University of Cambridge to join a program there.

Anand's family supports him completely, but the family has not enough money for him to travel to England. Anand and Rajendra go to the minister Shriram Singh for help, but he denies any such promise. Anand tries to show his medal as proof and a reminder of Shriram's word of honor, but still does not get the money. They both try to collect money but remain helpless. The same night, Rajendra has a heart attack and passes away while his sons rush him to the hospital. Anand refuses to go to Cambridge due to his father's death and their financial condition.

He then sells papads in the city to add income to the family. One day, he meets Lallan Singh, an [crony\servant] of Shriram Singh, who runs a high-profile coaching center. Lallan takes Anand in as a teacher in 'Excellence Coaching Centre'. This helps Anand financially and also earns him praise for his teaching. One fateful day, Anand sees the plight of a boy who had to leave due to poverty. Recalling Rajendra's words, he realizes that these poor kids also have a right to study. Eventually, he leaves the coaching center and starts separate tuition for poor kids in which he enrolls 30 kids at a time. Unfortunately, this hurts him financially and also costs him the support of his love interest, Supriya. But he decides, nonetheless, to teach the kids in an enthusiastic and practical manner by clearing concepts in an easy and fun way. All this enrages Lallan, whose center is facing criticism for not retaining Anand.

Lallan, in an effort to bring back Anand, tries to give free geometry boxes to Anand's center but does not succeed. He challenges Anand to a duel, in which Lallan's students and Anand's students write the same exam, and the coaching center with the lowest average score would be closed. The exam happens. In a ceremony announcing the results of the exam, Anand's students are devastated to know that they lost. To present the papers, which Anand signed before the competition, Lallan invites Supriya, and her husband Purshottam an IAS officer, which shocks Anand. However, the papers are not found, which spurs Anand to deny such claims of him signing the papers. It is later revealed that Supriya hid the papers, meaning that she understood Anand's decision to tutor poor kids.

While in course of the tuition, Anand gets immense help from his brother Pranav and his mother Jayanti. Lallan and Shriram plot to have Anand and the students killed so that his kids won't take the Indian Institute of Technology exam (IIT-JEE). Anand is hurt brutally by two of Lallan's henchmen and is hospitalized, on the verge of death. He tells his students to use their knowledge to defeat the goons sent by Shriram, while he is being treated. The students, in unity, use their knowledge of different concepts and subjects and defeat the goons. Anand is treated successfully and recuperates. A few months later the students take the IIT exam and all 30 of them crack it successfully.

Cast 
 Hrithik Roshan as Anand Kumar, a successful mathematician who opens a program named Super 30 to teach 30 poor students for JEE Advanced examination
 Mrunal Thakur as Supriya Kumar Singh, a professional dancer who is Anand's love interest but marries Purushottam instead
 Virendra Saxena as Rajendra Kumar, Anand and Pranav's father who dies after a heart attack when Anand misses a chance to join Cambridge University because he was poor.
 Nandish Sandhu as Pranav Kumar, Anand's brother who supports him in his work
 Aditya Srivastava as Lallan Singh, Shriram's evil assistant who used education only as a means of business.
 Sadhana Singh as Jayanti Kumar, Anand and Pranav's hardworking mother
 Pankaj Tripathi as Shriram Singh, local minister
 Vijay Varma as Fugga Kumar, one of Anand's students who recollects his teacher's life as a successful man in London.
 Amit Sadh as Raghunath Bharat, reporter
Anud Singh Dhaka as Raghunath's aid
Sharat Sonu as Haadim Malik, Shriram's secretary
Manav Gohil as IAS Purushottam Singh, Supriya's husband
Aayush Kumar Shukla as Vinod
Rahul Raj as Kishore
Dharmveer Jakhar as Social Activist
Deepali Gautam as Kusum
Ali Haji as Prithvi
Rajesh Sharma as Bachchi
Karishma Sharma in item number "Paisa"
 Vivek Jha as villager
 Krithi Shetty as an excellence student

Production
Principal photography commenced in November 2017. Mrunal Thakur was cast opposite Hrithik Roshan in the film. The film was shot at Ramnagar Fort; part of the fort was converted to look like the Super 30 institute. The film was also shot for ten days in Sambhar Lake Town which was shown as Kota, Rajasthan and Jaipur. A set was erected in Mumbai at the cost of 10 crore to recreate Patna city of Bihar to facilitate shooting. In second schedule of Varanasi shooting, the film was shot at Banaras Hindu University in the end of June 2018. This was the first Hindi film that the university allowed to be shot at its campus. Filming was completed in September 2018. Television actor Nandish Sandhu made his film debut in the film; he played Roshan's younger brother.

Soundtrack

Ajay Atul composed the music for the film and lyrics are written by Amitabh Bhattacharya. Vipin Nair of The Hindu gave the soundtrack 3.5/5, calling it a "pretty engaging soundtrack". The Times of India based Debarati Sen, in her review, said the composers "do not fail to impress".

Marketing and release
The first look posters of Hrithik Roshan from Super 30 were unveiled on 5 September 2018 to coincide with the Teacher's Day in India. Second poster with new release date was revealed on 12 January 2019. Another look of Hrithik Roshan from the film unveiled in new poster on 2 June. The next day another poster with Roshan soaking in the rain of success with motto "Misaal Bano, Haqdaar Bano" was released. one day later on 4 June official trailer of the film was released by Reliance Entertainment. It garnered 44.99 million views since its release on YouTube.

The film's producer reported that Hrithik Roshan will be accompanied by Anand Kumar for the promotion of Super 30.

The film was theatrically released in India on 12 July 2019, as the release date was advanced by fourteen days.

The film has been certified with a runtime of 155 mins by British Board of Film Classification and was released on 12 July 2019.

Reception

Critical response 
The film received positive reviews from critics.

Sreeparna Sengupta of The Times of India gave the film three and a half stars out of five, and praised Hrithik Roshan, Pankaj Tripathi, Aditya Srivastava and cinematography of Anay Goswami. She felt that Super 30 conveyed the message that though education is the privilege of people with good economic background, if given the level field others too can shine equally. Concluding, she wrote "While the narrative does have its flaws, Super 30 is a human drama and the story of a teacher who triumphs over the many challenges that life throws at him, to set an example for the world to see. Just for that it’s worth a watch." Writing for the NDTV Saibal Chatterjee, rated it with two stars out of five and felt that erratic screenplay of Super 30 had 'skimmed the surface of a massive mound of tangled issues', and that Hrithik Roshan was miscast as Anand Kumar. He opined that the major problem with the film was telling a true story, which was not convincing. He concluded the review as, "The idea to bronze up Hrithik Roshan so that he can impersonate Anand Kumar is anything but super: it is a formula that equals zero." Samrudhi Ghosh of India Today rated it with two and a half stars out of five, but praised the performances of Pankaj Tripathi and Aditya Srivastava. Ghosh felt the film was lengthy and had aroused the dramatics without need, saying "Under the guidance of math wizard Anand Kumar, his Super 30 turned out to be miracles. Under the guidance of Vikas Bahl, Hrithik Roshan's Super 30 is far from one."

Priyanka Sinha Jha of News18, disagreeing with Ghosh praises Roshan and ensemble of Pankaj Tripathi, Virendra Saxena, Nandish Sandhu and Aditya Srivastav for their performances. She feels that Roshan has given an admirable performance. Agreeing with Sengupta she opines that education is a means to a better life, but is a privilege in itself, and that is what the film questions and challenges. She rates the film with three stars out of five, and concludes,  "After all, as the famous saying goes—“Not all superheroes wear capes.” Super 30 is the story of one such.." Shubhra Gupta of The Indian Express gave two stars out of five and termed the film 'way less than super', she opined that if handled in right way, it would have been a 'rousing, goosebumps-inducing, cheer-athon.' She summarised by stating, "Yes, the real-life story is inspiring. But the telling of it is a drag. The film has its moments, which belong mostly to its young people: the kids are all right."

Box office
Super 30 collected 11.83 crore  from India, and 6.18 crore from overseas on the opening day. Next day (Saturday) showing upward trend the film collected 18.19 crore from India, and 5.46 crore from overseas. The film grossed 75.08 crore in the opening weekend, and 112.65 crore in the opening week worldwide.

, with gross of 172.84 crore from India and 36.09 crore from overseas, the film has grossed 208.93 crore worldwide. The film entered the 100 crore club on 21 July 2019.

Awards and nominations

References

External links
 
 
 

Indian biographical films
2019 films
2010s Hindi-language films
Reliance Entertainment films
Films set in Patna
Biographical films about educators
Films about the education system in India
Films about examinations and testing
Films about higher education
Films about teacher–student relationships
2010s biographical films
Films directed by Vikas Bahl
Films shot in Varanasi
Films shot in Rajasthan
Films shot in Jaipur
Films shot in Odisha
Films about corruption in India
Films about the caste system in India
Films about mathematics